Fort Morgan can apply to any one of several places in the United States:

Fort Morgan (Alabama), a fort at the mouth of Mobile Bay
Fort Morgan, Alabama, a nearby community
Fort Morgan (Colorado), a frontier military post located in present-day Fort Morgan, Colorado
Fort Morgan, Colorado, a city located in Morgan County